The 1998 Páginas Amarillas Open was a women's tennis tournament played on outdoor clay courts in Madrid in Spain that was part of Tier III of the 1998 WTA Tour.  It was the third edition of the tournament and was held from May 18 through May 23, 1998.

Winners

Women's singles

 Patty Schnyder defeated  Dominique Van Roost 3–6, 6–4, 6–0
 It was Schnyder's 4th title of the year and the 4th of her career.

Women's doubles

 Florencia Labat /  Dominique Van Roost defeated  Rachel McQuillan /  Nicole Pratt 6–3, 6–1
 It was Labat's only title of the year and the 6th of her career. It was Van Roost's 2nd title of the year and the 7th of her career.

 
Paginas
WTA Madrid Open (tennis)
Paginas